The long-crested myna (Basilornis corythaix) is a species of starling in the family Sturnidae. It is endemic to Seram Island.

Its natural habitats are subtropical or tropical moist lowland forest and subtropical or tropical moist montane forest.

References

long-crested myna
Birds of Seram
long-crested myna
Taxonomy articles created by Polbot